Edwin Milton Royle (March 2, 1862 – February 16, 1942) was an American playwright. He was born in Lexington, Missouri, and died in New York City.
Over 30 of his plays were performed. His best-known play is The Squaw Man (1905), which  became the first Hollywood film directed by Cecil B. DeMille in 1914.

California Motion Picture Company made a film adaptation of his play "Unwritten Law" (Unwritten Law (1916 film)).

He was married to Selena Fetter. Their daughter Selena Royle (1904–83) was a successful stage and film actress.

References

External links
 
IMDb

1862 births
1942 deaths
American dramatists and playwrights